Louis Martin (born 1875, date of death unknown) was a French water polo player and freestyle swimmer. He won three bronze medals at the 1900 Summer Olympics, in water polo, 4000 m freestyle and 200 m team swimming, and finished ninth and fifth in the 200 m and 1000 m freestyle swimming events, respectively.

See also
 List of Olympic medalists in swimming (men)
 List of Olympic medalists in water polo (men)

References

External links
 

Place of birth missing
French male freestyle swimmers
French male long-distance swimmers
French male water polo players
Swimmers at the 1900 Summer Olympics
Water polo players at the 1900 Summer Olympics
Olympic swimmers of France
Olympic bronze medalists for France
Olympic water polo players of France
Olympic medalists in water polo
Olympic bronze medalists in swimming
1875 births
Year of death missing
Medalists at the 1900 Summer Olympics
Date of birth missing
Place of death missing